Urolithin A is a metabolite compound resulting from the transformation of ellagitannins by the gut bacteria. It belongs to the class of organic compounds known as benzo-coumarins or dibenzo-α-pyrones. Its precursors – ellagic acids and ellagitannins – are ubiquitous in nature, including edible plants, such as pomegranates, strawberries, raspberries, walnuts, and others. Since the 2000s, urolithin A has been the subject of preliminary studies regarding its possible biological effects.

Urolithin A is not known to be found in any food source. Its bioavailability mostly depends on individual microbiota composition, as only some bacteria are able to convert ellagitannins into urolithins.

Chemistry 
Urolithin A belongs to the class of organic compounds known as benzo-coumarins or dibenzo-α-pyrones. These are polycyclic aromatic compounds containing a 1-benzopyran moiety with a ketone group at the C2 carbon atom (1-benzopyran-2-one).

Biochemistry and metabolism 

Pomegranate fruits, walnuts or raspberries are sources of ellagitannins. Ellagitannins are hydrolyzed in the gut to release ellagic acid, which is further processed by the gut microflora into urolithins through the loss of one of its two lactones and by successive removal of hydroxyl groups. 

While studies have shown that Gordonibacter urolithinfaciens and Gordonibacter pamelaeae play a role in the conversion of ellagic acids and ellagitannins into urolithin A, the microorganisms responsible for the complete transformation into the final urolithins are still unknown. The efficiency of the conversion of ellagitannins into urolithin A significantly varies in humans, and some individuals do not show any conversion.

When synthesized and absorbed in the intestines, urolithin A enters the systemic circulation where it becomes available to tissues throughout the body where it is further subjected to additional chemical transformations (including glucuronidation, methylation, sulfation, or a combination of them) within the enterocytes and hepatocytes. Urolithin A and its derivatives - urolithin A glucuronide and urolithin A sulfate being most abundant - release into the circulation, before being excreted in the urine.

Safety 
In vivo studies did not determine any toxicity or specific adverse effects following dietary intake of urolithin A. Safety studies in elderly humans indicated urolithin A was well tolerated. In 2018, the US Food and Drug Administration listed urolithin A as a safe ingredient for food or dietary supplement products having content in the range of 250 mg to one gram per serving.

Dietary sources 
Urolithin A is not known to be found in any food but rather forms as the result of transformation of ellagic acids and ellagitannins by the gut microflora in humans. Sources of ellagitannins are: pomegranates, nuts, some berries (raspberries, strawberries, blackberries, cloudberries), tea, muscadine grapes, many tropical fruits, and oak-aged wines (table below). 

The conversion of the ellagic acids into urolithin A depends on individual microflora composition and can vary significantly.

See also 
 Urolithins

References

External links 
 
 Urolithin A at the Human Metabolome Database

Coumarins
Benzochromenes
Phenolic human metabolites